Robert IV of Artois (1356 – 20 July 1387), son of John of Artois, Count of Eu and Isabeau of Melun, was Count of Eu from April to July 1387.

About 1376, he married Joanna of Durazzo, daughter of Charles, Duke of Durazzo. Robert IV inherited the County of Eu on 6 April 1387, along with Saint-Valery and Ault, however, in Naples at the time, he never learned of his father's death. He and his wife were poisoned whilst staying at Castel dell'Ovo on 20 July 1387, on the orders of Joanna's own sister Margaret, Queen Regent of Naples. Robert and Joanna were buried in the church of San Lorenzo Maggiore in Naples.

The marriage of Robert and Joanna had remained childless. Robert was succeeded in Eu by his younger brother Philip of Artois, Count of Eu.

References

Sources

1356 births
1387 deaths
Counts of Eu
Deaths by poisoning
House of Artois
French people murdered abroad
People murdered in Italy